José Luis Treviño Rodríguez (born 30 November 1955) is a Mexican politician affiliated with the National Action Party. As of 2014 he served as Deputy of the LIX Legislature of the Mexican Congress representing Jalisco.

References

1955 births
Living people
Politicians from Jalisco
National Action Party (Mexico) politicians
Deputies of the LIX Legislature of Mexico
Members of the Chamber of Deputies (Mexico) for Jalisco